Mary Patricia "Mollie" Panter-Downes (25 August 1906 – 22 January 1997) was a British novelist and columnist for The New Yorker. Aged sixteen, she wrote The Shoreless Sea which became a bestseller and was serialised in The Daily Mirror. Her second novel The Chase was published in 1925.

Early life and education
Panter-Downes was born to Major Edward Martin Panter-Downes (died 1914 at Mons) and Marie Kathleen Cowley who was of Irish origin.

Career
In 1922, aged sixteen, Panter-Downes wrote The Shoreless Sea which became a bestseller; eight editions were published in 1923 and 1924, and the book was serialised in The Daily Mirror. Her second novel The Chase was published in 1925.

In 1938, Panter-Downes began writing for The New Yorker, first a series of short stories, and from September 1939, a column entitled Letter from London, which she wrote until 1984. The collected columns were later published as Letters from England (1940) and London War Notes (1972).

Panter-Downes visited Ootacamund, in India, and wrote about the town, known to all as Ooty, in her New Yorker columns. This material was later published as Ooty Preserved.

Death
Panter-Downes married Clare Robinson in 1927 and the couple moved to Surrey.

She died in Compton, Surrey, aged 90.

Publications

Selected works
The Shoreless Sea (1923)
The Chase (1925)
Storm Bird (1929)
My Husband Simon (1931)
One Fine Day (1947)
Minnie's Room (short stories collected between 1947–1965)
Good Evening, Mrs Craven (short stories collected between 1938–1944)
Ooty Preserved: A Victorian Hill Station in India (1967)
At The Pines (biography of Swinburne} (1971)

Republished by Persephone Books
London War Notes (wartime letters written for The New Yorker) Republished in 2014 by Persephone Books
Minnie's Room (Short stories collected between 1947–1965) Republished in 2002 by Persephone Books
Good Evening, Mrs Craven (short stories collected between 1938–1944) Republished in 1999 by Persephone Books
The last short story in Minnie's Room, called "The Empty Place" and written in 1965, has a character called Harry Potter.

References

Sources

 The Independent, Obituary, Mollie Panter Downes (Mrs C. Robinson)
 Encyclopedia.com
 Who's Who

Further reading
 Biographical information at persephonebooks.co.uk

1906 births
1997 deaths
English columnists
The New Yorker people
People from Surrey
20th-century English novelists